Blue Shift is the debut studio album by Australian contemporary jazz ensemble Clarion Fracture Zone.

At the ARIA Music Awards of 1991, the album won ARIA Award for Best Jazz Album.

Track listing

Release history

References

1990 albums
ARIA Award-winning albums
Clarion Fracture Zone albums
Jazz albums by Australian artists